Jose T. Almonte was the National Security Advisor and Director-General of the National Security Council in the Cabinet of Philippine President Fidel V. Ramos.  He was also the head of the National Intelligence Coordinating Agency and the Director of the Economic Intelligence and Investigation Bureau (EIIB) during the administration of Pres. Corazon Aquino.

Prior to his retirement from the Armed Forces of the Philippines in 1986, Brig. Gen. Almonte was the Deputy Chief of Staff for Civil-Military Relations.

Early years
Jose Almonte was born to a poor family in Polangui, Albay on November 27, 1931.  According to Almonte in his memoirs, he has chosen to pursue a career in the military as this was one of the options which would allow him to pursue free education.

Military and political career

Military career
Jose Almonte entered the Philippine Military Academy as plebe on April 1, 1952, finishing with the Class of '56.

As a young Lieutenant, he was assigned in Gitingan in the mountains of Laguna and Quezon provinces during the waning days of the HUKBALAHAP.  A neighboring unit then was commanded by Korean War veteran Capt. Fidel Ramos, and it was here where Lt. Almonte forged a lifelong friendship with Capt. Ramos, who later became the President of the Philippines.

Almonte testifies that this was his only "field command" as he was confronted by his own troops about field mismanagement, that was led to a formal complaint up to the Company level.  Instead of being court-martialed for command responsibility as he requested, Almonte was sent to Fort McKinley to go through a Combat Intelligence course.  He testifies that this incident has made a profound impact on his idealism on soldiery and opened his "eyes to the realities and consequences of military mismanagement in the field."

During the administration of Pres. Diosdado Macapagal, Capt. Almonte served as the Deputy Commander of the Presidential Security Agency.

Under pressure from the American government, Pres. Ferdinand Marcos wielded support of its campaign in the Vietnam War.  Capt. Almonte was assigned in a three-man advance party along with Maj. Fidel Ramos to lay down the ground work for the arrival of the Philippine Civic Action Group (PHILCAGV).

Capt. Almonte acted as the Intelligence Officer for PHILCAGV.  And, in this capacity, without escaping controversy and the ire of the American intelligence community in Vietnam, Capt. Almonte was able to successfully contact his counterparts in the National Liberation Front, or commonly known as the Viet Cong.  This later on built Capt. Almonte's reputation as a deep-penetration agent, and one whose exploits is nothing less than "shadowy, sneaky, mysterious and enigmatic."

Building good relations with the local Viet Cong commander in the Tay Ninh Province, in the southwestern part of South Vietnam, he assured them that the PHILCAGV was in their country to help build and provide civic services and not conduct combat operations.  Unlike the South Korean contingent, PHILCAGV was able to keep its casualties down.  Instead of the usual one-year assignment, Capt. Almonte rotated three years in Vietnam with the PHILCAGV.  For his gallantry in Vietnam from 1967–1969, he was awarded by Pres. Marcos the Distinguished Conduct Star.

Upon return to the Philippines, he was once more assigned to work in Malacañan Palace as aide-de-camp to Executive Secretary Alejandro Melchor Jr.  It was during this career season that Maj. Almonte along with Sec. Melchor was able to establish the diplomatic ties between the Philippines and the USSR through the help of Prof. Ajit Singh Rye of the Institute of Asian Studies in the University of the Philippines.

It was through Prof. Rye that Sec. Melchor and Maj. Almonte was able to pave way for an endorsement to Indira Gandhi for a dialogue with Moscow. This was the plan as the Philippines then was considered as the United States' strongest ally in Southeast Asia, and a reliable partner during the Cold War.  However, the government of Pres. Marcos saw that the US was going to lose in Vietnam, and thus the need to establish ties with the "enemy."

With one visit to New Delhi in 1975, Maj. Almonte met with the Ambassador of the USSR, which no sooner led to a flight by Sec. Melchor and Maj. Almonte to Moscow where they were received as state guest. By 1976, the Philippines and the Soviet Union formally established diplomatic relations.

Considered as one of the level-headed thinkers and strategist in the AFP, Col. Almonte was approached by the leaders of the Reform the Armed Forces Movement (RAM) during its infancy, to seek counsel and have him take as an advisor to the group.  Almonte worked with Lt. Col. Victor Batac in formulating long-term strategies of the group, leading him to be considered as the "Godfather of the RAM".

Almonte retired from the Armed Forces in 1986 with a rank of Major General.

Political career
Right after his retirement, Pres. Cory Aquino called on Almonte to take charge of Operation Big Bird, the government's efforts in recovering the hidden wealth of the late President Ferdinand E. Marcos in Switzerland and other offshore banking areas.  When the Operation Big Bird was wrapped up by the Presidential Commission on Good Government (PCGG), Almonte was tasked by Pres. Cory Aquino to head the EEIB.

From 1992 to 1998, Almonte was a key member of the Cabinet of the administration of President Fidel V. Ramos as National Security Advisor, and Director-General of the National Security Council.

In 1995 the Polytechnic University of the Philippines awarded him an Honorary Doctorate in Public Administration.

Controversies

On February 25, 2015, Almonte launched a book entitled "Endless Journey: A Memoir" as told to veteran journalist Marites Dañguilan-Vitug.

In the book, he recalled the late years of the regime led by strongman Ferdinand Marcos and the birth of the Reform the Armed Forces Movement, a group of soldiers that led the military rebellion.

Leaders of the RAM, however, including Sen. Gregorio Honasan, then a colonel, belied Almonte's narrative in the book, which they called "dishonest and irresponsible."

"With particular respect to his dealings with and role in the activities of the RAM, Almonte has flatly concocted events that never happened..." Honasan said in an article he co-authored with fellow RAM members Felix Turingan and Rex Robles.

They particularly slammed Almonte's claims about RAM dealings with the United States. They said the memoirs "were directly in conflict with the reality at the time."

"The reply by Honasan, as quoted in the book, that we were simply asking for 'moral support' from the US government sounds artificial and asinine," the RAM leaders wrote in their article published by the Philippine Daily Inquirer.

Awards and citations
Distinguished Conduct Star
Order of Sikatuna, Rank of Datu

Bibliography
 Toward one Southeast Asia : collected speeches; Quezon City : Institute for Strategic and Development Studies, 2004. xvi, 318 p. : port. ; 23 cm. 
My part in the 1986 people power revolution; Quezon City : Institute for Strategic and Development Studies, 2006. 80 p. : facsims ; 19 cm.
We Must Level the Playing Field; Metro Manila, Philippines : Foundation for Economic Freedom, 2007. xvi, 273 p. ; 26 cm.

See also
Fidel Ramos

References

1931 births
Filipino generals
Philippine Military Academy alumni
Filipino military personnel
Philippine Army personnel
Filipino military personnel of the Vietnam War
Reform the Armed Forces Movement
Living people
People from Albay
Recipients of the Distinguished Conduct Star
National Security Advisers of the Philippines
Ramos administration cabinet members
Heads of government agencies of the Philippines
Corazon Aquino administration personnel